Silverstoneia nubicola (Boquete rocket frog) is a species of frog in the family Dendrobatidae. It is found in western Colombia, Panama, and southwestern Costa Rica.

Description
Males measure  and females  in snout–vent length. Males have a swollen middle finger. The dorsum is dark brown, becoming black along the sides. A thin cream-colored line, extending from the groin to the eye, separates the brown and black areas. A second light line extends from the upper lip to the groin, bordering the black sides below; the latter line is more evident in males because of their black throat and chest. The ventral surface is pale yellow in females.

Reproduction
Breeding occurs throughout the year. Males call from their territories on the forest floor in early morning and late afternoon. Eggs are laid in leaf litter in the male territories. Males carry the newly hatched tadpoles to streams where they continue development.

Habitat and conservation
Its natural habitats are humid lowland, premontane and montane forests. It is threatened by chytridiomycosis and habitat loss.

References

nubicola
Amphibians of Colombia
Amphibians of Costa Rica
Amphibians of Panama
Amphibians described in 1924
Taxa named by Emmett Reid Dunn
Taxonomy articles created by Polbot